John Edward Gunderson (born May 1, 1980) is a retired American mixed martial artist. He used to fight with the UFC and SCC also numerous other  organizations  being a champion or fighting for the championship in many of them. Once he was a top 10 lightweight outside the UFC
 Gunderson is also an International Fight League veteran who fought out of Ken Shamrock's Lion's Den and was a member of the Nevada Lions alongside The Ultimate Fighter: Heavyweights winner Roy Nelson. He is currently training with Xtreme Couture and TapouT.
 a coach out of Syndicate MMA

Mixed martial arts career

Ultimate Fighting Championship

Gunderson made his UFC debut at UFC 108 against Rafaello Oliveira with 12 days notice on January 2, 2010. He lost the fight via unanimous decision.

Gunderson was supposed to make his next appearance against Paul Taylor at UFC 112, but the fight was canceled last minute due to Taylor not being medically cleared.

Gunderson was scheduled to face Taylor at The Ultimate Fighter: Team Liddell vs. Team Ortiz Finale, but Taylor was forced out of the bout again. Gunderson fought and defeated UFC newcomer and Canadian kickboxing champ Mark Holst.

Gunderson was expected to face Efrain Escudero on September 15, 2010 at UFC Fight Night 22, however Escudero fought Matt Wiman as Mac Danzig was pulled from the card due to injury. Gunderson instead faced returning UFC veteran and former number 2 world ranked lightweight Yves Edwards, and lost the fight via unanimous decision. He was later released from UFC.

World Series of Fighting

Gunderson made his World Series of Fighting debut on June 14, 2013, against UFC vet Dan Lauzon at WSOF 3. He lost the fight via unanimous decision. He then faced Chris Gruetzmacher at WSOF 9 on March 29, 2014. Gunderson lost the fight via unanimous decision.

SCC
After winning his promotional debut with a fight of the night Gunderson Faced Team Alpha Male standout and coach Justin Buchholz. Being a 3-1 underdog Gunderson battered Buchholz with strong hooks and take downs eventually winning by Kimura in the 3rd round.

Other promotions
Gunderson faced Jeff Fletcher at Rage in the Cage 172 on June 7, 2014. He won the fight via guillotine choke, snapping his three-fight losing streak in the process.

Bellator and retirement
Gunderson was expected to face Alexander Sarnavskiy on October 10, 2014 at Bellator 128. However, Gunderson pulled out of the bout and then retired from mixed martial arts competition. His reasons for retirement was due to a "lack of drive to compete" and a "desire to move into other ventures." Gunderson retired with a record of 35–16–2.

Gunderson retired with over 13 different titles in smaller MMA promotions and was for a long time one of the top lightweights on the regional circuit. Numerous times it seemed he could not get over the hump and break into the elite, even though he owned a few impressive stoppages over elite competitors.

Personal life
John and his fiancee, Kristin Stewart, have two daughters.

Championships and accomplishments
ShoFIGHT
ShoFIGHT Welterweight Championship (One time)
Superior Cage Combat
SCC Lightweight Championship (One time)

Mixed martial arts record

|-
| Win
| align=center| 35–16–2
| Jeff Fletcher
| Submission (guillotine choke)
| RITC: Rage in the Cage 172
| 
| align=center| 3
| align=center| 2:26
| Phoenix, Arizona, United States
| 
|-
| Loss
| align=center| 34–16–2
| Chris Gruetzemacher
| Decision (unanimous)
| World Series of Fighting 9: Carl vs. Palhares
| 
| align=center| 3
| align=center| 5:00
| Paradise, Nevada, United States
| 
|-
| Loss
| align=center| 34–15–2
| Dan Lauzon
| Decision (unanimous)
| World Series of Fighting 3
| 
| align=center| 3
| align=center| 5:00
| Las Vegas, Nevada, United States
| 
|-
| Loss
| align=center| 34–14–2
| David Castillo
| Submission (rear-naked choke)
| Caged Combat 6: Day of the Warrior
| 
| align=center| 4
| align=center| 3:30
| Grand Ronde, Oregon, United States
| 
|-
| Win
| align=center| 34–13–2
| Karo Parisyan
| Submission (guillotine choke)
| ShoFIGHT MMA 20
| 
| align=center| 1
| align=center| 2:47
| Springfield, Missouri, United States
| Won vacant ShoFIGHT Welterweight Championship
|-
| Win
| align=center| 33–13–2
| Justin Buchholz
| Submission (kimura)
| Superior Cage Combat 4
| 
| align=center| 3
| align=center| 2:34
| Las Vegas, Nevada, United States
| Won SCC Lightweight Championship
|-
| Loss
| align=center| 32–13–2
| Niko Puhakka
| Decision (split)
| Fight Festival 31
| 
| align=center| 3
| align=center| 5:00
| Helsinki, Finland
| 
|-
| Win
| align=center| 32–12–2
| James Birdsley
| Submission (rear-naked choke)
| Superior Cage Combat 2
| 
| align=center| 2
| align=center| 2:06
| Las Vegas, Nevada, United States
| Catchweight (160 lb) bout
|-
| Loss
| align=center| 31–12–2
| Dominique Robinson
|  TKO referee stoppage due to exhaustion
| TPF 8: All or Nothing
| 
| align=center| 3
| align=center| 0:41
| Lemoore, California, United States
| 
|-
| Win
| align=center| 31–11–2
| Alejandro Solano Rodriguez
| Submission (kimura)
| XVT 5 - Franca vs. Kheder
| 
| align=center| 1
| align=center| 1:34
| Cartago, Costa Rica
| 
|-
| Loss
| align=center| 30–11–2
| Yves Edwards
| Decision (unanimous)
| UFC Fight Night: Marquardt vs. Palhares
| 
| align=center| 3
| align=center| 5:00
| Austin, Texas, United States
| 
|-
| Win
| align=center| 30–10–2
| Mark Holst
| Decision (unanimous)
| The Ultimate Fighter 11 Finale
| 
| align=center| 3
| align=center| 5:00
| Las Vegas, Nevada, United States
| 
|-
| Loss
| align=center| 29–10–2
| Rafaello Oliveira
| Decision (unanimous)
| UFC 108
| 
| align=center| 3
| align=center| 5:00
| Las Vegas, Nevada, United States
| 
|-
| Win
| align=center| 29–9–2
| Steve Sharp
| Submission (kimura)
| MMA Xplosion - Gunderson vs. Sharp
| 
| align=center| 3
| align=center| 3:17
| Las Vegas, Nevada, United States
| 
|-
| Win
| align=center| 28–9–2
| Fabian Acuna
| Submission (kimura)
| ROF 35 - Summer Brawl
| 
| align=center| 1
| align=center| 2:18
| Broomfield, Colorado, United States
| 
|-
| Win
| align=center| 27–9–2
| Dan Russom
| Submission (Peruvian necktie)
| DB 37 - Desert Brawl 37
| 
| align=center| 1
| align=center| 2:10
| Bend, Oregon, United States
| 
|-
| Loss
| align=center| 26–9–2
| Bryan Travers
| Decision (unanimous)
| PFC 13: Validation
| 
| align=center| 3
| align=center| 3:00
| Lemoore, California, United States
| 
|-
| Win
| align=center| 26–8–2
| Eric Regan
| Submission (kimura)
| RITC 125 - Rage in the Cage 125
| 
| align=center| 2
| align=center| 0:55
| Phoenix, Arizona, United States
| 
|-
| Win
| align=center| 25–8–2
| Alexander Crispim
| Decision (split)
| PFC 12: High Stakes
| 
| align=center| 3
| align=center| 3:00
| Lemoore, California, United States
| 
|-
| Loss
| align=center| 24–8–2
| Ryan Schultz
| Decision (split)
| IFL - Las Vegas
| 
| align=center| 3
| align=center| 5:00
| Las Vegas, Nevada, United States
|
|-
| Loss
| align=center| 24–7–2
| Wagnney Fabiano
| Submission (guillotine choke)
| IFL - World Grand Prix Semifinals
| 
| align=center| 2
| align=center| 1:53
| Chicago, Illinois, United States
| 
|-
| Win
| align=center| 24–6–2
| Gabriel Casillas
| Submission (rear-naked choke)
| IFL - Las Vegas
| 
| align=center| 2
| align=center| 2:58
| Las Vegas, Nevada, United States
| 
|-
| Loss
| align=center| 23–6–2
| Bart Palaszewski
| Decision (split)
| IFL - Moline
| 
| align=center| 3
| align=center| 4:00
| Moline, Illinois, United States
| 
|-
| Win
| align=center| 23–5–2
| Josh Odom
| Submission (triangle choke)
| IFL - Oakland
| 
| align=center| 1
| align=center| 3:05
| Oakland, California, United States
| 
|-
| Win
| align=center| 22–5–2
| Bryan Caraway
| Submission (armbar)
| DB 19 - Oregon vs Texas
| 
| align=center| 2
| align=center| 4:10
| Bend, Oregon, United States
| 
|-
| Win
| align=center| 21–5–2
| Mike Joy
| KO (Knee)
| DB 17 - DesertBrawl 17
| 
| align=center| 1
| align=center| 1:09
| Bend, Oregon, United States
| 
|-
| Win
| align=center| 20–5–2
| Cam Ward
| Decision (unanimous)
| SF 14 - Resolution
| 
| align=center| 3
| align=center| 5:00
| Portland, Oregon, United States
| 
|-
| Win
| align=center| 19–5–2
| Danny Payne
| Submission (Kimura)
| DB 15 - DesertBrawl 15
| 
| align=center| 1
| align=center| 0:28
| Bend, Oregon, United States
| 
|-
| Win
| align=center| 18–5–2
| Rudy Garcia
| Submission (rear-naked choke)
| UCF - Night of Champions
| 
| align=center| N/A
| align=center| N/A
| Medford, Oregon, United States
| 
|-
| Win
| align=center| 17–5–2
| Charles Bennett
| TKO
| GC 40 - Gladiator Challenge 40
| 
| align=center| 2
| align=center| 1:28
| Bend, Oregon, United States
| 
|-
| Win
| align=center| 16–5–2
| Shawn Bias
| Submission (triangle arm bar)
| DB 14 - DesertBrawl 14
| 
| align=center| 1
| align=center| N/A
| Bend, Oregon, United States
| 
|-
| Loss
| align=center| 15–5–2
| Frank Watts
| Technical Submission (guillotine choke)
| XFC - Dome of Destruction 2
| 
| align=center| 1
| align=center| 0:47
| Tacoma, Washington, United States
| 
|-
| Win
| align=center| 15–4–2
| Enoch Wilson
| Submission (rear-naked choke)
| SF 9 - Respect
| 
| align=center| 1
| align=center| 3:06
| Gresham, Oregon, United States
| 
|-
| Win
| align=center| 14–4–2
| Armando Valadez
| Submission (rear-naked choke)
| RITR 10 - Rumble in the Ring 10
| 
| align=center| 1
| align=center| 1:36
| Auburn, Washington, United States
| 
|-
| Loss
| align=center| 13–4–2
| Donny Raines
| Submission (armbar)
| DB 12 - DesertBrawl 12
| 
| align=center| 1
| align=center| N/A
| Bend, Oregon, United States
| 
|-
| Win
| align=center| 13–3–2
| Dave Rivas 
|KO (Punches and Knees)
| DB 11 - DesertBrawl 11
| 
| align=center| 3
| align=center| N/A
| Bend, Oregon, United States
| 
|-
| Win
| align=center| 12–3–2
| Mike Jonet
| Submission (rear-naked choke)
| PFA - Pride and Fury
| 
| align=center| 1
| align=center| 0:27
| Worley, Idaho, United States
| 
|-
| Draw
| align=center| 11–3–2
| Rob Hisamoto
| Draw
| FCFF - Fight Night 4
| 
| align=center| 2
| align=center| 5:00
| Medford, Oregon, United States
| 
|-
| Win
| align=center| 11–3–1
| Rob Hisamoto
| KO (punches and knees)
| DB 10 - DesertBrawl 10
| 
| align=center| 3
| align=center| 0:45
| Bend, Oregon, United States
| 
|-
| Win
| align=center| 10–3–1
| Brad Horner
| Submission (armbar)
| SF 2 - On the Move
| 
| align=center| 1
| align=center| 1:15
| Portland, Oregon, United States
| 
|-
| Win
| align=center| 9–3–1
| Dean Lavin
| TKO
| FCFF - Rumble at the Roseland 11
| 
| align=center| 1
| align=center| 3:02
| Portland, Oregon, United States
| 
|-
| Win
| align=center| 8–3–1
| Chris Young
| Submission (armbar)
| DB 9 - DesertBrawl 9
| 
| align=center| 1
| align=center| 4:17
| Bend, Oregon, United States
| 
|-
| Loss
| align=center| 7–3–1
| Chris Irvine
| Submission (armbar)
| URC 6 - Ultimate Ring Challenge 6
| 
| align=center| 2
| align=center| 1:15
| Longview, Washington, United States
| 
|-
| Win
| align=center| 7–2–1
| Pedro Castaneda
| Submission (triangle choke)
| TQP - Sport Fight "Devastation"
| 
| align=center| 1
| align=center| 1:10
| Oregon City, Oregon, United States
| 
|-
| Win
| align=center| 6–2–1
| Shawn Cahill
| Submission
| FCFF - Rumble at the Roseland 9
| 
| align=center| 2
| align=center| 3:55
| Portland, Oregon, United States
| 
|-
| Loss
| align=center| 5–2–1
| Chad Nelson
| TKO (punches)
| Rumble at the Roseland 8
| 
| align=center| 1
| align=center| 1:44
| Portland, Oregon, United States
| 
|-
| Win
| align=center| 5–1–1
| Vince Guzman
| Submission (armbar)
| DB 7 - Battle in Bend
| 
| align=center| 1
| align=center| 1:40
| Bend, Oregon, United States
| 
|-
| Win
| align=center| 4–1–1
| Dominic Rivera
| TKO (punches)
| FCFF - Rumble at the Roseland 7
| 
| align=center| N/A
| align=center| N/A
| Portland, Oregon, United States
| 
|-
| Draw
| align=center| 3–1–1
| Armando Valadez
| Draw
| XRW - Xtreme Ring Wars 1
| 
| align=center| 3
| align=center| 3:00
| Wenatchee, Washington, United States
| 
|-
| Win
| align=center| 3–1
| Lin Tru
| TKO (punches)
| PPKA - Rock 'N' Rumble
| 
| align=center| 1
| align=center| 1:20
| Olympia, Washington, United States
| 
|-
| Win
| align=center| 2–1
| Brock Mclure
| TKO (punches and knees)
| SO - Showdown in the Octagon
| 
| align=center| N/A
| align=center| N/A
| Boise, Idaho, United States
| 
|-
| Loss
| align=center| 1–1
| Charlie Fortec
| Submission (guillotine choke)
| DB 6 - DesertBrawl 6
| 
| align=center| 1
| align=center| 1:27
| Redmond, Oregon, United States
| 
|-
| Win
| align=center| 1–0
| Al Libey
| TKO (punches)
| DB 5 - DesertBrawl 5
| 
| align=center| 1
| align=center| N/A
| Bend, Oregon, United States
|

References

External links
 
 
 John Gunderson IFL Page
 International Fight League

1979 births
Living people
American male mixed martial artists
Mixed martial artists from Oregon
Lightweight mixed martial artists
Welterweight mixed martial artists
Ultimate Fighting Championship male fighters